Thisted municipality is a municipality (Danish: kommune) in North Jutland Region, Denmark. The municipality covers an area of 1,072 km², and has a total population of 43,089 (2022). The main town and the site of its municipal council is the town of Thisted.

On 1 January 2007 Thisted municipality was, as the result of Kommunalreformen ("The Municipal Reform" of 2007), merged with Hanstholm and Sydthy municipalities to form a new Thisted municipality.

Locations

Thy

Thisted municipality is roughly identical with the traditional district of Thy, except that the municipality includes a small portion of the district Hanherred, but not the southernmost peninsula of Thy, Thyholm.

Politics

Municipal council
Thisted's municipal council consists of 27 members, elected every four years.

Below are the municipal councils elected since the Municipal Reform of 2007.

Notable people 

 Niels Andersen (1835 in  Ydby, Thisted County - 1911) a Danish businessman and politician; created the first large construction company in Denmark; lived in Søholm from 1877  
 Andreas Riis Carstensen (1844 in Sennels, near Thisted – 1906) a Danish painter who specialized in maritime scenes, notably of Greenland.
 Johan Skjoldborg (1861 in Øsløs in Thisted – 1936) a Danish educator, novelist, playwright and memoirist
 Andrew Petersen (1870 near Thisted – 1953) was a patternmaker, foundry company executive and politician in New York City
 Aage Oxenvad (1884 in Gettrup near Thisted – 1944) a Danish clarinetist who played in the Royal Danish Orchestra from 1909
 Erik Aalbæk Jensen (1923 in Thy – 1997) a Danish writer and Lutheran minister
 Bent Larsen (1935 in Tilsted near Thisted – 2010) a Danish chess grandmaster and author
 Jonas Vingegaard (born 1996 in Hillerslev) a Danish cyclist

References 
 
 Municipal statistics: NetBorger Kommunefakta, delivered from KMD aka Kommunedata (Municipal Data)
 Municipal mergers and neighbors: Eniro new municipalities map

External links

Municipality's official website (In Danish)

 
Municipalities of the North Jutland Region
Municipalities of Denmark
Populated places established in 2007